Shawn Maurice Barry (born April 23, 1990) is a Puerto Rican footballer.

Professional
Barry made three appearances in the USL Premier Developmental League for Fort Lauderdale Schulz Academy in mid-2010.
Barry joined LASK Linz in July 2010.  He made his full debut on May 22, 2011, in a 1–0 loss to Wacker Innsbruck. After winning the three league championships in Austria in five years, 2015 saw Barry move to Germany's 2nd division as he signed for FSV Frankfurt.

On July 8, 2017, he signed a contract with Korona Kielce.

He was released during the winter break and returned to his native United States with Real Salt Lake ahead of the 2018 Major League Soccer season. Barry was released by Salt Lake at the end of their 2018 season.

On February 1, 2019, Barry signed his first professional contract with a team in his home state of Florida by joining the Tampa Bay Rowdies.

International

In August 2018, Barry was called up by new head coach Amado Guevara to the Puerto Rico national football team for the CONCACAF Nations League qualifying against St. Kitts and Nevis. He got his first international cap on September 9, 2018.

References

External links
 University of Virginia bio
 

1990 births
Living people
People from Miramar, Florida
Soccer players from Florida
Sportspeople from Broward County, Florida
American sportspeople of Puerto Rican descent
Association football defenders
American soccer players
American expatriate soccer players
American expatriate soccer players in Germany
Virginia Cavaliers men's soccer players
Floridians FC players
LASK players
FSV Frankfurt players
Korona Kielce players
Real Salt Lake players
Real Monarchs players
Tampa Bay Rowdies players
USL League Two players
Austrian Football Bundesliga players
2. Bundesliga players
3. Liga players
Ekstraklasa players
Major League Soccer players
Expatriate footballers in Austria
Expatriate footballers in Poland
American expatriate sportspeople in Austria
American expatriate sportspeople in Poland
USL Championship players
Puerto Rican footballers
Puerto Rico international footballers